Erika Jeannine Edwards is a professor at Yale University known for her work on evolution of plants. She is also the director of the Marsh Botanical Garden.

Education and career 
Edwards has a B.S. from Stanford University (1998) and earned her Ph.D. from Yale University where she worked on the evolution of the Pereskia, a genus of cactus. Following her Ph.D. she was a postdoctoral researcher at the University of California at Santa Barbara before accepting a position at Brown University as an assistant professor in 2007. In 2017 she moved to Yale University as a professor and director of the Marsh Botanical Garden.

In 2020 she began her term as president of the Society of Systematic Biologists.

Research 
Edwards research focuses on succulents and the evolution of C4 carbon fixation in plants. Her early research centered on Pereskia where she examined its physiology and the its place in the evolutionary history of cactus plants. Her research into C4 carbon fixation has examined how climate change alters the distribution of the C4 grasses and revealed that the C4 carbon fixation pathway gives plants an advantage in dry environments. Her subsequent research tracked the increase in C4 grasses with increases in tropical woodlands and savannas. Edwards led the working group which established the phylogeny of C4 grasses and defined the genetic differences across different types of grass. She uses changes in leaf shape to define how plants expend their resources during growth, examines plants' responses to changes in biome. and compares the parallel evolution of C4 photosynthesis and crassulacean acid metabolism.

Selected publications

Awards and honors 
In 2016, Edwards received a Presidential Early Career Award for Scientists and Engineers (PECASE).

References

External links 
 

Stanford University alumni
Yale Graduate School of Arts and Sciences alumni
Yale University faculty
Women botanists
Women evolutionary biologists
Women climatologists
Living people
Year of birth missing (living people)
Recipients of the Presidential Early Career Award for Scientists and Engineers